was a Japanese artist of the 20th century. He is known for his paintings and calligraphy.

Career 
Initially, in the 1930s, Suda painted in a figurative style (Yoga) before moving on to become an important abstract painter of the Japanese Avant-garde art scene throughout the 1950s, 60s and 70s.

In his later life, he focused on Zen calligraphy. He was an active member of numerous discussion groups regarding art and calligraphy and in 1955 he co-founded the Modern Art Club of the Kansai region along with Yoshihara Jiro (1905–1972), Yagi Kazuo (1918–1979) and Tsutaka Waichi (1911–1995). In 1967, he became a teacher at Nishinomiya School.

In the 1970s, he illustrated many travel essays and in 1985, wrote a book entitled Watakushi no zokei: Gendai Bijutsu (My Shaping: Modern Art), a philosophical volume concerning his thoughts and influences.

Collections 
Works by the artist can be found in the collections of:

The Museum of Modern Art, Saitama
Iida City Museum of Art, Nagano
Osaka Prefecture (Osaka Prefectural 20th Century Art Collection)
Konosu City, Saitama
Miho Museum, Shiga
Otani Memorial Art Museum, Hyogo
Shinseikan – Kokuta Suda, Tatsuzo Shimaoka Museum, Hokkaido
Gangōji Temple, Nara
Jakushū Itteki Library, Fukui
Kahitsukan Kyoto Museum of Contemporary Art, Kyoto
Shizuoka Prefectural Museum of Art
L.A. County Museum of Art

References

20th-century Japanese painters
Japanese contemporary artists
Japanese calligraphers
1906 births
1990 deaths